According to the United States Board on Geographic Names, there are at least 109 named mountain ranges and sub-ranges in Wyoming. 

Wyoming  is a state in the mountain region of the Western United States.  Wyoming is the 10th most extensive, but the least populous and the 2nd least densely populated of the 50 United States.  The western two thirds of the state is covered mostly with the mountain ranges and rangelands in the foothills of the Eastern Rocky Mountains, while the eastern third of the state is high elevation prairie known as the High Plains.

The mountain ranges below are listed by name, county, coordinates, and average elevation as recorded by the U.S. Geological Survey. Sub-ranges are indented below the name of the primary range. Some of these ranges extend into Colorado, Montana, Idaho, and Utah.

 Absaroka Range, Park County, Wyoming, el. 
 Badger Hills, Sheridan County, Wyoming, el. 
 Badlands Hills, Sweetwater County, Wyoming, el. 
 Bald Range, Uinta County, Wyoming, el. 
 Bear Lodge Mountains, Crook County, Wyoming, el. 
 Beaver Creek Hills, Sheridan County, Wyoming, el. 
 Beartooth Mountains; Park County, Wyoming; ; 
 Bighorn Mountains, Johnson County, Wyoming, el. 
 Bridger Mountains, Fremont County, Wyoming, el. 
 Buck Creek Hills, Niobrara County, Wyoming, el. 
 Buck Creek V S, Big Horn County, Wyoming, el. 
 Castle Gardens, Fremont County, Wyoming, el. 
 Coalbank Hills, Natrona County, Wyoming, el. 
 Cow Creek Breaks, Campbell County, Wyoming, el. 
 Deer Creek Breaks, Campbell County, Wyoming, el. 
 Deer Creek Range, Natrona County, Wyoming, el. 
 Duck Creek Breaks, Campbell County, Wyoming, el. 
 Duck Creek Breaks, Campbell County, Wyoming, el. 
 Edmo Buttes, Fremont County, Wyoming, el. 
 Ferris Mountains, Carbon County, Wyoming, el. 
 Flattop Buttes, Sweetwater County, Wyoming, el. 
 Fort Steele Breaks, Carbon County, Wyoming, el. 
 Freak Mountains, Fremont County, Wyoming, el. 
 Freezeout Mountains, Carbon County, Wyoming, el. 
 Gallatin Range, Park County, Wyoming, el. 
 Gannett Hills, Lincoln County, Wyoming, el. 
 Gas Hills, Fremont County, Wyoming, el. 
 Granite Mountains, Fremont County, Wyoming, el. 
 Green Mountains, Fremont County, Wyoming, el. 
 Gros Ventre Range, Teton County, Wyoming, el. 
 Gumbo Hills, Hot Springs County, Wyoming, el. 
 Hamilton Hills, Niobrara County, Wyoming, el. 
 Harney Hills, Niobrara County, Wyoming, el. 
 Haystack Mountains, Carbon County, Wyoming, el. 
 Haystack Range, Goshen County, Wyoming, el. 
 Haystacks, Natrona County, Wyoming, el. 
 Hells Half Acre, Natrona County, Wyoming, el. 
 Honeycomb Buttes, Sweetwater County, Wyoming, el. 
 Horseshoe Hills, Niobrara County, Wyoming, el. 
 Ishawooa Hills, Park County, Wyoming, el. 
 Jack Morrow Hills, Sweetwater County, Wyoming, el. 
 Kirkland Mountains, Fremont County, Wyoming, el. 
 Laramie Mountains, Albany County, Wyoming, el. 
 Lavender Hills, Teton County, Wyoming, el. 
 Leucite Hills, Sweetwater County, Wyoming, el. 
 Little Mitchell Creek Breaks, Campbell County, Wyoming, el. 
 Medicine Bow Breaks, Carbon County, Wyoming, el. 
 Medicine Lodge Big Game Winter Range, Big Horn County, Wyoming, el. 
 Miller Hills, Converse County, Wyoming, el. 
 Mine Hills, Albany County, Wyoming, el. 
 Mitchell Creek Breaks, Campbell County, Wyoming, el. 
 Moneta Hills, Fremont County, Wyoming, el. 
 Moore Spring Hills, Goshen County, Wyoming, el. 
 Old Woman Creek Hills, Niobrara County, Wyoming, el. 
 Oregon Buttes, Sweetwater County, Wyoming, el. 
 Owl Creek Mountains, Fremont County, Wyoming, el. 
 Owl Hills, Fremont County, Wyoming, el. 
 Pedro Mountains, Carbon County, Wyoming, el. 
 Powder River Breaks, Johnson County, Wyoming, el. 
 Powder River Breaks, Sheridan County, Wyoming, el. 
 Prairie Dog Hills, Campbell County, Wyoming, el. 
 Prospect Mountains, Sublette County, Wyoming, el. 
 Pumpkin Buttes, Campbell County, Wyoming, el. 
 Rattlesnake Hills, Natrona County, Wyoming, el. 
 Rawhide Buttes, Goshen County, Wyoming, el. 
 Red Hills, Converse County, Wyoming, el. 
 Red Hills, Lincoln County, Wyoming, el. 
 Red Hills, Johnson County, Wyoming, el. 
 Red Hills, Campbell County, Wyoming, el. 
 Red Hills, Teton County, Wyoming, el. 
 Red Hills, Sublette County, Wyoming, el. 
 Red Hills, Teton County, Wyoming, el. 
 Red Mountains (Wyoming)-(also a range for Utah), Teton County, Wyoming, el. 
 Richeau Hills, Platte County, Wyoming, el. 
 Rocky Mountains, Teton County, Wyoming, el. 
 Saddleback Hills, Carbon County, Wyoming, el. 
 Salt River Range, Lincoln County, Wyoming, el. 
 Sand Hills, Carbon County, Wyoming, el. 
 Sand Hills, Fremont County, Wyoming, el. 
 Sand Hills, Fremont County, Wyoming, el. 
 Savage Hills, Carbon County, Wyoming, el. 
 Seaman Hills, Niobrara County, Wyoming, el. 
 Seminoe Mountains, Carbon County, Wyoming, el. 
 Session Mountains, Uinta County, Wyoming, el. 
 Seventy-Seven Hills, Niobrara County, Wyoming, el. 
 Shamrock Hills, Carbon County, Wyoming, el. 
 Sheep Mountain, Big Horn County, Wyoming, el. 
 Sherman Mountains, Albany County, Wyoming, el. 
 Sherrill Hills, Niobrara County, Wyoming, el. 
 Shirley Mountains, Carbon County, Wyoming, el. 
 Sierra Madre, Carbon County, Wyoming, el. 
 Snake River Range, Teton County, Wyoming, el.  
 Snowy Range, Albany County, Wyoming & Carbon County, Wyoming, el. 
 Sublette Range, Lincoln County, Wyoming, el. 
 T A Hills, Johnson County, Wyoming, el. 
 Tepee Mountains, Sweetwater County, Wyoming, el. 
 Teton Range, Teton County, Wyoming, el. 
 The Brakes, Crook County, Wyoming, el. 
 The Breaks, Carbon County, Wyoming, el. 
 The Palisades, Park County, Wyoming, el. 
 The Sand Hills, Carbon County, Wyoming, el. 
 The Vees, Washakie County, Wyoming, el. 
 Three Brothers Mountains, Teton County, Wyoming, el. 
 Tunp Range, Lincoln County, Wyoming, el. 
 Twin Hills, Goshen County, Wyoming, el. 
 Twin Mountains, Laramie County, Wyoming, el. 
 Wanker Hills, Niobrara County, Wyoming, el. 
 Washburn Range, Park County, Wyoming, el. 
 Wildcat Hills, Goshen County, Wyoming, el. 
 Wind River Range, Sublette County, Wyoming, el. 
 Wyoming Range, Lincoln County, Wyoming, el.

See also
 Mountains and mountain ranges of Yellowstone National Park
 Mountain passes in Wyoming (A-J)
 Mountain passes in Wyoming (K-Y)

Notes

Mountain ranges of Wyoming
Wyoming, List of mountain ranges in
Mountain ranges
Wyoming